Iain Gillies Armstrong, Lord Armstrong (born 26 May 1956) is a Senator of the College of Justice, a judge of the Supreme Courts of Scotland.

Legal career
Iain Armstrong is a graduate of the University of Glasgow. He was called to the Scottish Bar in 1986. He served as standing junior counsel to the Department of Social Security from 1998 to 2000, when he was appointed a Queen's Counsel. Thereafter, he served as a full-time Advocate Depute in the Crown Office until 2003, when he returned to private practice. He was a member of Scotland's Standing Committee on Legal Education from 1995 until 1999.  He was a governor of Fettes College from 2001 until 2011. He served as Vice-Dean of the Faculty of Advocates from 2008 until 2013.  From 2009 until 2015 he was a member of the Advisory Panel to the School of Law of the University of Glasgow. On 15 February 2013, he was appointed a Senator of the College of Justice.

References

Year of birth missing (living people)
Living people
Scottish King's Counsel
Senators of the College of Justice
Alumni of the University of Glasgow
Members of the Faculty of Advocates
21st-century King's Counsel
1956 births